

Catholic

Latin Church

Archdiocese of Ottawa-Cornwall 
The Archdiocese of Ottawa-Cornwall includes several parishes outside the city limits, which have been included in the list. Francophone communities are marked with a fleur-de-lys: .

Personal Ordinariate of the Chair of Saint Peter 
 Annunciation of the Blessed Virgin Mary

Roman Catholic Military Ordinariate of Canada 
 Our Lady of the Airways Chapel (see Ecumenical below)

Melkite (Greek) Catholic Church
Saints Peter and Paul Melkite Catholic Church

Syriac Maronite Church of Antioch
Saint Charbel Maronite Catholic Church

Syriac Catholic Church
Saint Paul Syriac Catholic Mission

Ukrainian Greek Catholic Church
St. John the Baptist Ukrainian Catholic Shrine

Canonically irregular groups 
 Society of St Pius X Mission, meeting at the Holy Ghost Chapel.

Old Catholic Church 
 Mission Parish of St. Aelred  Old Roman Catholic.

Christian Science 
First Church of Christ, Scientist, designed by John Pritchard MacLaren 1913–14.

Gnostic Catholic Apostolic Church  (EGCA)
Gnostic Church of Ottawa-Gatineau

Ecumenical 
Canadian Forces Support Unit Ottawa Chaplain Services

Canadian Forces Ottawa Chapel houses "Our Lady of the Airways" Our Lady of the Airways Chapel and "Elizabeth Park Protestant Congregation". These are the ecumenical faith communities meeting in the Uplands Site chapel (337 Breadner Boulevard, Gloucester) located beside Ottawa's International Airport on the former Canadian Forces Uplands Military Base.( ) These worshiping communities are part of the Canadian Forces Support Unit Ottawa Chaplain Services and have regular Roman Catholic and Protestant services serving military members and their families in the National Capital Region. As well, there is assistance for other denominations.

Orthodox

Eastern Orthodox

Patriarchate of Constantinople 
 Christ the Saviour

Greek Orthodox Church 
 Kimisis Tis Theotokos (Dormition of the Theotokos)

Greek Orthodox Church of Antioch 
 St. Elias Cathedral
 St. Elijah Antiochian Orthodox Church, built 1950. The church was sold in 1989, with the community moving to St. Elias Cathedral, and the building was converted to St. Elijah's Housing.

Orthodox Church in America 
 Annunciation Cathedral

Romanian Orthodox Church 
 St. Matthew
 St. Nicholas

Russian Orthodox Church Outside Russia 
 Protection of the Holy Virgin Memorial Church
 St. Xenia of Petersburg

Serbian Orthodox Church 
 St. Stefan - Serbian Orthodox Church (Ottawa)
 Meeting of the Lord - Serbian Orthodox Parish (Ottawa)

Ukrainian Orthodox Church 
Assumption of the Blessed Virgin Mary Cathedral

Oriental Orthodox

Coptic Orthodox Church 
 St. George and St. Anthony 
 St. Mark and St. Mary of Egypt
 St. Mary

Ethiopian Orthodox Tewahedo Church 
 St. Teklehaimanot

Eritrean Orthodox Church 
 Kidus Gabriel

Armenian Orthodox Church 
 St. Mesrob

Protestant

Anglican

Anglican Church of Canada

Diocese of Ottawa

Anglican Church in North America 
Blackburn Hamlet Community Church
Church of the Messiah
St. Peter & St. Paul's Anglican Church

Anglican Catholic Church
St. Matthew the Apostle

The Anglican Mission in Canada
HUB Ottawa

Associated Gospel 
 Community Bible Church
 Metropolitan Bible Church (a.k.a. "The Met")
 Trinity Bible Church of Ottawa

Baptist 

First Baptist Church
Grace Baptist Church Ottawa
McPhail Memorial Baptist Church
The Crossroads Church
Calvary Baptist Church
Alta Vista Baptist Church
Emmanuel Baptist Church
Fourth Avenue Baptist Church
Fellowship Baptist Church of Kanata
Kanata Baptist Church
Bethany Baptist Church
Bromley Road Baptist Church
Bilberry Creek Baptist Orleans
Eglise Evangelique Baptiste d'Orleans
Centre Évangélique Francophone d'Ottawa (CEFO)
Britannia Baptist Church
Sequoia Community Church
Celebration! Church
Parkdale Baptist Church
Crosspoint Baptist Church

Brethren in Christ 
 The Meeting House, remote site at Cineplex Lansdowne

Charismatic Churches 
Abundant Life Christian Fellowship
Barrhaven New Life Church
Vineyard Ottawa
Catch The Fire Ottawa

Christian Brethren 
Rideauview Bible Chapel
Bridlewood Bible Chapel
Downtown Outreach Bible Chapel
Ottawa Gospel Hall

Christian and Missionary Alliance (C&MA)
Cedarview Alliance Church
East Gate Alliance Church
Eglise Biblique de la Grace Divine
Emmanuel Alliance Church of Ottawa
Filipino Community Church
Ottawa Chinese Alliance Church
Redeemer Alliance Church
Agape Chinese Alliance Church
Ottawa Mandarin Alliance Church
Pathway Church Kanata

Evangelical

Evangelical Free Church of Canada 
 Ottawa Chinese Bible Church

Evangelical Missionary Church of Canada 
Christian Family Worship Centre Ottawa (formerly Church of Hope)
Rhema International Church

The Salvation Army in Canada

The Salvation Army Ottawa Citadel
 The Salvation Army Barrhaven Church

Lutheran

Canadian Association of Lutheran Congregations
 All Saints Lutheran Church

Evangelical Lutheran Church in Canada
 Faith Evangelical Lutheran Church
 German Evangelical Martin Luther Church
 Good Shepherd Anglican Lutheran Ministry
 Mount Calvary Lutheran Church
 Peace Latvian Evangelical Lutheran Church
 Resurrection Lutheran Church
 St. John Evangelical Lutheran Church
 St. Peter's Evangelical Lutheran Church

Lutheran Church–Canada
 Christ Risen Lutheran Church
 Iglesia Luterana Unidos en Cristo
 Our Saviour Lutheran Church
 St. Luke Lutheran Church

Wisconsin Evangelical Lutheran Synod
 Abiding Word Lutheran Church
 Divine Word Lutheran Church
 St. Paul Lutheran Church

Mennonite 
Ottawa Mennonite Church
Church of the Living Word, whose worship service is held in Amharic
The Village IMC, which meets at the Centre Richelieu in Vanier

Mennonite Brethren 
The Gathering

Methodist 
See also United Church of Canada below

Free Methodist Church in Canada
Arlington Woods Free Methodist Church
Chapel Ridge Free Methodist Church
Ecclesiax Free Methodist Church
Église Methodiste Libre De La Derniere Heure

Independent Holiness Church
 Metcalfe Holiness Church
 Shiloh Holiness Church

Pentecostal

Pentecostal Assemblies of Canada
Bethel Pentecostal Church
Comm Pent Church of Ottawa
Grace Assembly 
Iglesia La Vid (meets at Nepean Baptist Church)
Lifecentre
Lifecentre Kanata
Living Waters Christian Assembly (formerly The Westend Church)
The Oasis
Parkway Road Pentecostal Church
Peace Tower Church
Pentecostal Community Church
Vanier Community Church
Woodvale Pentecostal Church

Other
All Nations Full Gospel Church
Church of Grace, with services in English, French, and Tamil; meets at Carleton University.
Church of Hope, with services in Tamil.
The Church of Pentecost Canada, Ottawa Assembly
Église Nouveau Départ de Rockland
Elizabeth Park Protestant Congregation, Uplands (Old Uplands Air Base)
Grace Assembly Pentecostal Church
Kingdom Culture Ministries
Mahanaim International Ministries / Ministerios Internacionales Mahanaim
Mount Zion Church of the Firstborn
myChurch meets at Algonquin Commons Theatre
New Beginning Church of Rockland
New Hope Community Church
The Ottawa Church of God
The Redeemed Christian Church of God Overcomer's Chapel
Shiloh Holiness Church
Shoreline Community Church
Overflowing Glory Bible Church, 32 Colonnade Rd, suite 200B, off Merivale Rd, Ottawa. We meet every Sundays 11am and 2pm. Prayers, worship and Praise, Teaching, Solemnization of Marriages, Deliverance and Miracles services, Holy Communion, Baptism by immersion, Global Missionaries work. Support our Ministry Tel: 6137002477. Rev ASIAN DANIEL, Snr Pastor/President, Overflowing Glory Bible Church, Ontario, Canada. Come fellowship with the Holy Spirit. Your life shall never be the same again.

Presbyterian

Presbyterian Church in Canada

Presbytery of Ottawa
The Presbytery of Ottawa also includes two churches outside the city limits: St. Andrew Presbyterian Church in Aylmer, and Upper Room Presbyterian Church in Rockland.
Calvin Hungarian Presbyterian Church
Gloucester Presbyterian Church
Grace Presbyterian Church
Knox Presbyterian Church Manotick
Knox Presbyterian Church
Osgoode Presbyterian Church
Parkwood Presbyterian Church
pccbarrhaven, meeting at St. Emily's school in Barrhaven
St. Andrew's Presbyterian Church (Kars)
St. Andrew's Presbyterian Church (Ottawa)
St. Andrew's Presbyterian Church (Richmond)
St. Andrew's Presbyterian Church (Stittsville)
St. David & St. Martin Presbyterian Church
St.Giles' Presbyterian Church
St. Paul's Presbyterian Church by James Strutt 1959
St. Stephen's Presbyterian Church
St Timothy's Presbyterian Church by Burgess, McLean & MacPhadyen 1959 
Trinity Presbyterian Church
Westminster Presbyterian Church

Presbyterian Church in America
Resurrection Church

Reformed Presbyterian Church of North America
Ottawa Reformed Presbyterian Church

Reformed

Christian Reformed Church
Barrhaven Fellowship Christian Reformed Church
Calvary Christian Reformed Church
Calvin Christian Reformed Church
Kanata Community Christian Reformed Church
Living Hope Community Church

Canadian and American Reformed Churches
Jubilee Canadian Reformed Church

Seventh-day Adventist Church 
Eglise Adventiste Francophone d'Ottawa
Hope Central Adventist Group
Lily of the Valley Adventist Company
Kanata Adventist Company
Nepean Adventist Church
Orleans Adventist Church
Orleans French Adventist Church
Ottawa Adventist Church
Ottawa French Adventist Church
Ottawa East Adventist Church
Ottawa Spanish Adventist Company
West French Group

Unaffiliated
Abundant Life Christian Fellowship
 All Nations Church
 Calvary Baptist Church
 City View International Church
 Chinese Christian Church of Ottawa
 Mercy Community Church
 Metcalfe Street Church
 Christ Embassy Church
 myChurch meets at Algonquin Commons Theatre
 Ottawa River of Life Christian Church
 Pine Grove Bible Church
 Smiths Falls Bethel Pentecostal Church
Transforming Life Center
 Grace City Church Ottawa
 Crosspointe Ministries
 The Ottawa Church of Christ
 South Asian Christian Fellowship Of Ottawa meets at Metropolitan Bible Church

United Church of Canada

Ottawa Presbytery

Wesleyan 
Sunnyside Wesleyan Church 
Highland Park Wesleyan Church
 Kanata Wesleyan Church (a.k.a. "The Bridge")
Ottawa Mandarin Wesleyan Church
Crossway Christian Church, Victoria

Religious Society of Friends (Quakers) 
 Ottawa Friends Meeting

Unitarian Universalist 
First Unitarian Congregation of Ottawa
Unitarian Universalist Fellowship of Ottawa

Christian Fellowships 
  South Asian Christian Fellowship of Ottawa, meeting at the Metropolitan Bible Church (a.k.a. "The Met")

References

See also

List of Ottawa synagogues
List of Ottawa mosques
City of Ottawa
 

Churches
Ottawa